Roald Poulsen (born 28 November 1950) is a Danish association football manager, who most prominently won the 1989 Danish championship with Odense BK and managed the Zambia national football team. 

Poulsen started his coaching career with amateur club OKS. From 1983 to 1987, he managed B 1913. From 1988 to 1992, Poulsen managed Odense BK, with whom he won the 1989 Danish championship and 1992 Danish Cup tournament. From 1993 to 1994, Poulsen managed Viborg FF. In 1994, Poulsen was named manager of the Zambia national football team, which he managed until 1996. He returned to Odense BK in 1996, and brought with him Zambian internationals Mwape Miti and Andrew Tembo. In 1998, he moved to Qatar in order to manage Al-Rayyan Sports Club, staying at the club until 1999. 

From 1999 to 2004 he led the FC Copenhagen Sports College in South Africa, only interrupted by a brief spell as national manager of Zambia in 2002. He coached South African club Engen Santos from 2004 to 2005. In 2005, Poulsen returned to Denmark to manage Dalum IF. He moved in B 1913 in 2006, before moving to FC Fyn later that year. He stayed at FC Fyn until December 2007.

In January 2009 he was named technical director of Cape United Soccer School of Excellence in Cape Town.

References

External links

 Roald Poulsen Interview
 Here is Poulsen God

1950 births
Living people
Sportspeople from Odense
Danish football managers
Odense Boldklub managers
Viborg FF managers
Zambia national football team managers
Al-Rayyan SC managers
Al-Arabi SC (Qatar) managers
1996 African Cup of Nations managers
2002 African Cup of Nations managers
Boldklubben 1913 managers
Danish people of Norwegian descent
Dalum IF managers
Danish expatriate football managers
Danish expatriate sportspeople in South Africa
Danish expatriate sportspeople in Zambia
Danish expatriate sportspeople in Qatar
Expatriate football managers in Zambia
Expatriate football managers in Qatar
Expatriate soccer managers in South Africa